Epichirostenotes (meaning "above Chirostenotes", because it lived after the latter genus) is a genus of oviraptorosaurian dinosaur from the late Cretaceous. Epichirostenotes is known from an incomplete skeleton found in 1923 at the Horseshoe Canyon Formation, in strata dated to about 72 million years ago. It was first named by Robert M. Sullivan, Steven E. Jasinski and Mark P.A. van Tomme in 2011 and the type species is  Epichirostenotes curriei. Its holotype, ROM 43250, had been assigned to Chirostenotes pergracilis by Hans-Dieter Sues in 1997.

See also
 Timeline of oviraptorosaur research

References

Caenagnathids
Late Cretaceous dinosaurs of North America
Fossil taxa described in 2011
Horseshoe Canyon fauna
Paleontology in Alberta